Walthourville  is a city in Liberty County, Georgia, United States. When it was incorporated in 1974, it had a government entirely composed of women; and in 1978 it elected Carrie Kent, the first African-American woman mayor in Georgia history. Walthourville is a part of the Hinesville-Fort Stewart metropolitan statistical area.  The population was 4,111 at the 2010 census.

History

Walthourville draws its name from Andrew Walthour, a revolutionary soldier and a physician who established a plantation in the area circa 1795. The Walthourville Presbyterian Church was originally housed in a structure, erected in 1820, which served as a meeting place for both Baptists and Presbyterians. In 1845 a Presbyterian church was erected, which was destroyed by fire in 1877. The following year a new church was completed, with that structure being destroyed in a storm in 1881. The present church was dedicated in July 1884.

The Walthourville Academy, a non-sectarian co-educational school, was founded in 1823.  A post office was established on July 3, 1837

By the 1840s the town was one of the most prosperous towns in south Georgia. In 1854 the North Newport Church moved to Walthourville.

The tracks of the Savannah, Albany & Gulf Railroad reached Walthourville in 1857. The railroad merged with the Atlantic & Gulf Railroad and traversed south Georgia from Savannah to Bainbridge. The Walthourville depot was Station No. 4, the fourth to be constructed on the line from Savannah.

An 1862 guide to Confederate railroads provided the following description of Walthourville, "a post-town in Liberty county, Georgia, forty miles South-west of Savannah, is the largest place in the county. It contains two flourishing academies, and about 400 inhabitants."

By 1974 the town had an airstrip and an industrial park, and there was some concern the area might be annexed by nearby Hinesville, Georgia. Although the town was 179 years old, it was not officially chartered by the state. An attempt to do so by the male leaders of the town some 12 years earlier had failed due in part to "bickering."

A committee entirely composed of women completed the necessary census and circulated a petition as required, getting 300 signatures. When they filed the paperwork with the Georgia General Assembly for approval they named themselves the incorporating officers. "We thought it was all just on paper", said Mayor Lyndol Anderson. But when the approved papers arrived (signed by then-Governor Jimmy Carter) they realized they were required to serve as town government until the first election in December.

They were sworn into office in April 1974 becoming the one of the first all-woman governments of a municipality in Georgia history. (The first known instance was Oak Park in 1934). Coming as it did at the height of the women's liberation movement, the all-woman government of the town attracted much attention including national coverage by A.P., UPI, NBC Nightly News with John Chancellor and CBS Evening News with Walter Cronkite. The women of Walthourville, however, reportedly rejected the label of "women's libbers".

In December 1974 the all-woman slate ran in its first election, and were challenged by a slate of male candidates, none of whom succeeded. The women had proven themselves good campaigners as well as good governors. They had gotten streetlights installed in the town and put up street signs, and had not only levied no new taxes, but they had donated their own (nominal) official salaries back to the town.

Four years later, one man did join the council in the 1978 election. In the same election, council member Carrie Kent was elected mayor - the first African-american woman to be elected mayor in Georgia. In 2007 the town erected a historical marker commemorating the history of its incorporation (see photo).

Points of interest
In the vicinity of Walthourville across the county line near the intersection of Tibet Highway and Griffin Road lies Tea Grove Plantation, an outdoor collection of historic buildings, vehicles, and farming equipment open to the public.

Walthourville Presbyterian Church is on the National Register of Historic Places.

Geography

Walthourville is located at  (31.776124, -81.624229).

According to the United States Census Bureau, the city has a total area of 3.8 square miles (9.8 km), all land.

Demographics

2020 census

As of the 2020 United States census, there were 3,680 people, 1,652 households, and 1,006 families residing in the city.

2010 census
As of the 2010 United States Census, there were 4,111 people living in the city. The racial makeup of the city was 56.9% Black, 27.6% White, 0.6% Native American, 1.4% Asian, 0.5% Pacific Islander, 0.4% from some other race and 4.4% from two or more races. 8.3% were Hispanic or Latino of any race.

2000 census
As of the census of 2000, there were 4,030 people, 1,361 households, and 1,012 families living in the city. The racial makeup of the city was 36.97% White, 55.06% African American, 0.87% Native American, 0.94% Asian, 0.35% Pacific Islander, 2.98% from other races, and 2.83% from two or more races. Hispanic or Latino of any race were 6.38% of the population.

There were 1,361 households, out of which 51.7% had children under the age of 18 living with them, 53.0% were married couples living together, 15.5% had a female householder with no husband present, and 25.6% were non-families. 19.3% of all households were made up of individuals, and 3.1% had someone living alone who was 65 years of age or older.  The average household size was 2.96 and the average family size was 3.39.

In the city, the population was spread out, with 36.3% under the age of 18, 15.2% from 18 to 24, 36.0% from 25 to 44, 9.8% from 45 to 64, and 2.8% who were 65 years of age or older.  The median age was 24 years. For every 100 females, there were 97.9 males.  For every 100 females age 18 and over, there were 99.2 males.

The median income for a household in the city was $32,359, and the median income for a family was $34,980. Males had a median income of $26,382 versus $20,270 for females. The per capita income for the city was $12,291.  About 13.4% of families and 15.0% of the population were below the poverty line, including 20.3% of those under age 18 and 21.1% of those age 65 or over.

Government and infrastructure

The United States Postal Service operates the Walthourville Post Office.

Education
The Liberty County School District operates public schools serving Walthourville.

Notable people
William Bennett Fleming (1803 – 1886), U.S. Representative retired here
Patrick Hues Mell (1814 – 1888), Southern Baptist Convention President, University of Georgia chancellor
Robert Walthour (1878 – 1949), World Champion cyclist

Gallery

References

External links

 City of Walthourville
 City of Walthourville Historical Marker

Cities in Georgia (U.S. state)
Cities in Liberty County, Georgia
Hinesville metropolitan area